Influencias (English: Influences) is an album by Puerto Rican singer Chayanne released in 1994. The album is a tribute to several artists which have influenced Chayanne through his life.

Track listing
"La Vida Sigue Igual" (Original by Julio Iglesias)
"Amada Amante" (Original by Roberto Carlos)
"Una Muchacha y una Guitarra" (Original by Sandro)
"Yo Soy Aquél" (Original by Raphael)
"Pavo Real - Agarrense de las Manos" (Original by José Luis Rodríguez "El Puma")
"Gavilán o Paloma" (Original by José José)
"Querida" (Original by Juan Gabriel)
"Amor Libre" (Original by Camilo Sesto)
"Paso la Vida Pensando" (Original by José Feliciano)
"Pedro Navaja" (Original by Rubén Blades)

Charts

References

1994 albums
Chayanne albums
Spanish-language albums
Covers albums